Itheum alboscutellare is a species of beetle in the family Cerambycidae. It was described by Stephan von Breuning in 1940. It is known from Australia.

References

Lamiinae
Beetles described in 1940